Sticky bomb can refer to

Sticky bomb the popular name for the "No. 74 Grenade ST"
SS-HL-Handgranate, a German anti-tank grenade that used an adhesive pad to stick to the target
Hafthohlladung, a German anti-tank grenade that used magnets to stick to a tank.
Improvised explosive devices that rely on some sort of adhesive to remain on the target
Plot point in Saving Private Ryan
Nickname of a drummer in the Swedish hard rock band Wilmer X

See also

Stick grenade
Stick bomb
Limpet mine